Endava PLC is a British public-listed software development company, founded in 2000 in London, United Kingdom. It provides digital transformation consulting, agile software development services and various automation solutions.

The company's close-to-client offices are located across North America and Western Europe, and its nearshore delivery centers are located in Eastern Europe (Romania, Moldova, Bulgaria, Serbia, North Macedonia, Croatia, Bosnia and Herzegovina, Poland) and Latin America (Argentina, Uruguay, Venezuela, Mexico and Colombia).

History
Endava consists of two founding companies; Concise established in 2000 in London and Compudava established in 2000 in Chișinău, Moldova. The companies merged to officially form the Endava Group.

Milestones 

 In June 2015, Endava acquired Power Symbol Technology d.o.o., or PS Tech, headquartered in Belgrade, Serbia.
 In October 2015, they acquired Nickel Fish Design LLC, or Nickelfish, a New Jersey headquartered UX & design focused agency.
 In September 2016, Endava acquired Integrated Systems Development Corporation, or ISDC, with headquarters in the Netherlands, which was already present in Romania and Bulgaria with delivery units and client offices in the Netherlands.
 In December 2017, they bought Velocity Partners, an agile software development company with headquarters in the United States and nearshore delivery centers in Latin America.
 In July 2018, Endava starts trading at New York Stock Exchange through an IPO.
 In October 2018, Endava started a strategic partnership with Bain & Company.
 In April 2019, Endava is named as a principal partner of the FinTech Alliance, launched by the UK government to provide a global fintech marketplace.
 In June 2019, Endava opens two new software centers in Timișoara and Brașov in Romania.
In March 2021, Endava acquired FIVE, a Brooklyn headquartered product discovery, design, development and growth marketing agency with offices in Croatia.
In April 2021, Endava acquired Levvel LLC.

Products and Services

The company offers services with respect to strategy consulting, creative and user interface design, Insight through Data, Mobile and Internet of Things, Systems architecture, Automation, Software Engineering, Test automation, DevOps, Cloud computing, Advanced Application Management and Smart Desk.

Awards

 In 2014, Endava won the 20th annual IT Service & Support Awards Gala organized by the Service Desk Institute.
 In 2014, featured in Econsultancy's Top 100 Digital Agencies in several consecutive years, a guide to the UK's top digital agencies.
 In 2017, Endava ranked 7th, according to headcount, in the Financial Times 1000 list of Europe's Fastest Growing Companies.
 In 2017, Endava was recognized as ITO company of the Year, at the Romanian Outsourcing Awards for Excellence Gala.
 Endava was named Company of the Year at the 2018 ANIS Romania awards gala.
 In 2018, the company was also recognised as 22nd in The Sunday Times HSBC International Track 200 and ranked 4th by headcount, among the top 2% of the companies with the largest headcount in the UK in these rankings.
 The company was featured in the IAOP Global Outsourcing 100, outsourcing service providers for 3 consecutive years (2015 – 2018).

References

External links
 Official site

Companies based in London
Software companies based in London
Software companies established in 2000